The 2021–22 Weber State Wildcats men's basketball team represented Weber State University in the 2021–22 NCAA Division I men's basketball season. The Wildcats, led by 16th-year head coach Randy Rahe, played their home games at the Dee Events Center in Ogden, Utah, as members of the Big Sky Conference. After the season, Rahe would retire as the winningest coach in Weber State and Big Sky conference history.  He would be succeeded by assistant coach Eric Duft.

Previous season
In a season limited due to the ongoing COVID-19 pandemic, the Wildcats finished the 2020–21 season 17–6, 12–3 in Big Sky play to finish a tie for second place. As the No. 3 seed in the Big Sky tournament, they lost in the quarterfinals to Montana.

Roster

Schedule and results

|-
!colspan=12 style=| Exhibition

|-
!colspan=12 style=| Regular season

|-
!colspan=9 style=| Big Sky tournament

Source

References

Weber State Wildcats men's basketball seasons
Weber State Wildcats
Weber State Wildcats men's basketball
Weber State Wildcats men's basketball